The men's 10 km sprint competition of the 2015 Winter Universiade was held at the National Biathlon Centre in Osrblie on January 27.

Results

References 

Men's 10km